is a fictional Japanese fighting character and the main protagonist and master of ceremony of Capcom's Street Fighter series. Having premiered in the first Street Fighter in 1987, Ryu appears as the game's lead character alongside his best friend Ken Masters. He is the longest running fighting game character. Other games in the series show Ryu to be highly focused on his training, aiming to become the strongest he can.

He was created by Takashi Nishiyama. Nishiyama's inspiration was the martial artist Mas Oyama. For his second appearance, Ryu's design changed from that of a young fighter to a skilled Karate practitioner. However, because of issues in the making of Street Fighter II he possessed a major weakness within the cast. For the next titles, Ryu's fighting style was modified, so he had different skills with Evil Ryu and Kage possessing more diverse moves. Multiple actors have voiced him both in Japanese and in English.

Ryu has been the protagonist of the Street Fighter series since the first game and has appeared as a playable character in several crossover games involving the franchise, including the Marvel vs. Capcom series, Project X Zone and the Super Smash Bros. series. He is also featured in manga and anime adaptations and the 1994 live-action film. Ryu has become one of gaming's most iconic fighting game characters, but his evil persona has been criticized for retaining most of his regular form's moves.

Creation and development

Takashi Nishiyama's inspiration for Ryu was Mas Oyama, a character who first appeared in the kung fu series Karate Master by Ikki Kajiwara. Nishiyama grew up watching Ichidai's animated series, which was influenced by Oyama's life. Nishiyama was impressed by Oyama's martial arts skill and philosophies, and this inspired him to create the first Street Fighter game. Nishiyama wanted the game to have a story similar to a film, anime, or novel. Whereas Ryu was based on Oyama, his rival Sagat was also influenced by the protagonist's rivalry with a bald Muay Thai martial artist from the series.

Ryu's name was based on Nishiyama's name because the on'yomi (Sino-Japanese pronunciation) of the character "Takashi" is "Ryū" (Mandarin: Lóng, 隆). In addition, Ryu's  energy attack was based on the wave motion gun from the titular spacecraft in the sci-fi anime series Space Battleship Yamato, which Nishiyama watched during the seventies. Because Ryu was the only playable character in the original Street Fighter game, his designer Manabu Takemura wanted him to be easy for players to relate to.

In an interview with Game On!, Capcom Research and Development head Noritaka Funamizu said that of the series' characters, Ryu was one of the most popular with American audiences, alongside Zangief and Guile. Ryu's Shoryuken was noted to be highly difficult to execute, something which the team wanted to fix. Although Ryu and Ken had the same moves, Yoshiki Okamoto said Ryu was the weaker of the two. This was because Capcom had wanted to add a weak point to their Shoryukens. They later decided not to do so, but a mistake resulted in Ryu become the weaker character. Ryu and Ken were mainly handled by Shoei, who had clear memories of designing the Hadoken and Shoryuken. Shoei Okano recalled they were originally going to be Y.S.'s  characters in early stages of development. He noted, Ryu and Ken are the "so-called standard characters in the SFII world, and since they were coming from SFI, we could have the other characters be weirdos." As a result, the duo was redesigned to have a stoic feel.

Director Hideaki Itsuno remembers he was not allowed to work on Ryu because of his inexperience in making games. As a result, Itsuno worked on creating new characters for the series which could rival Ryu and Ken. In order to update Ryu's image while staying true to his character, Capcom created his alternative alterego Evil Ryu. However, it was not until Street Fighter IV that the staff decided to give him a more unique design though the designer was worried if he exaggerated too much with his look. In retrospective, Capcom felt the Evil Ryu was a success among players.

In the three Street Fighter III games, the designers described the older Ryu as a more hardcore fighter. Despite being Japanese, Capcom described him as an American martial artist which led to the creation of Makoto whose design was based on an Eastern point of view.

For Street Fighter IV, Kyle Hebert was cast as Ryu in preparation for the return of his "Evil Ryu" persona. The localization director Taliesin Jaffe told Hebert "you booked this because of Evil Ryu. It's not gonna be this year, it's not gonna be next year, but eventually when we get to it, we're gonna remember that this was part of the plan all along." In further elaborating on this idea, Jaffe said:
The whole idea of Ryu in the first place is that he's a Lancelot character, and I was prepared for the corruption of that character from the very beginning. We knew we were gonna go there, and actually part of the first audition for Ryu was, I had a couple lines I wanted them to read specifically in that darker vein.
The team wanted to avoid having Ryu sound like a traditional Japanese hero and generate a contrast between his and Ken's characters.
While Ryu has retained his original white gi outfit in most games, Capcom tried using an alternate high school uniform for Street Fighter V where he was presented as a rebel. The concept for Ryu was "leader"—leader of a student group or a bunch of delinquents. Super deformed versions of this image were used by the company as April Fool's jokes. While originally conceived as a character for fighting game newcomers, Ryu has been balanced across the series with 3rd Strike focusing on his defense. This balancing affected the character negatively to the point multiple expert players said that in Street Fighter V he was unsuitable for competitive fights. In 2019, Capcom patched the character, which garnered a positive response from fans. In previews of Street Fighter V Ryu was noted to have a more realistic look to the point of being compared to the Tekken characters. Capcom said this approach to Street Fighter Vs artistic design, focused on two main points: making the art "easy to follow and understand" and creating a "personality with artistic accents".

As downloadable content, Capcom created an alter ego of Ryu in Street Fighter V named Kage who represents the Satsui no Hado Ryu rejected. In early stages of development, Kage had a noticeably different design. His entire body showed no skin as it was covered in purple. Designing the character did not take too much time according to Takayuki Nakayama. His "design was nailed down pretty quick, so there aren't many prototype images that can be shown." He was loosely based on Ryu's dark persona from Street Fighter Alpha game's Evil Ryu.

Design
Ryu wears a white gi, as a symbol of his Japanese heritage, with the Japanese symbols for the Fūrinkazan (風林火山 (Hepburn: "Wind, Forest, Fire, Mountain")) on his belt as well as a stylised version on his gloves. While many Street Fighter characters have been redesigned, Ryu's design has stayed largely the same.

In Street Fighter II, the character was included because of presence in the first game, symbolizing the concept of a Japanese martial artist. As the series progressed, his design was made more muscular to coincide with the concept, while his white gi, considered his most defining characteristic by the development team, let viewers know he was "a karate master at first sight". For the Street Fighter Alpha games, Ryu was redesigned as a younger character. Artist Naoto "Bengus" Kuroshima noted that the expectations that come with drawing him or Chun-Li were greater compared to newcomers like Sakura Kasugano. When picking the cast of Street Fighter V, producer Yoshinori Ono said he wanted Ryu and the cast to differ from their previous characters although Ryu retained his original look in contrast to Ken. Ryu had multiple costumes in V including his Alpha, one with a notable sex appeal. . In 2020, Ryu received a Kairi costume. For the Championship Edition of the game, new moves were added to make Ryu a more defensive fighter.

Spin-offs and other media

Comic book writer Len Strazewski wanted to tell a more dramatic storyline for Ryu based in a comic book narrative. Like storylines involving chaos, Strazewski wrote a comic in which Ryu was the center of attention as he sought revenge. As a result, to find a motivation for Ryu's character, he planned to kill his best friend Ken Masters. However, since the comic book was cancelled after its third issue, this plot was never fully explored. Mangaka Masahiro Nakahiro o wrote his own take on Ryu during his career, aiming for a more serious take on Ryu's personality in his works.

Actor Byron Mann said in the making of the live-action Ryu he had no knowledge of Ryu's identity or what Street Fighter was originally about. Director Steven E. de Souza wanted Mann to play Ryu, but Capcom was not keen because they had their own actor, Kenya Sawada, who had played the character in various promotions in Japan. Sawada would play a more serious Ryu in contrast to Mann's portrayal. Nevertheless, DeSouza was able to use Mann in the film as Sawada's English was not good. Ken Masters' actor, Damian Chapa, said the name is pronounced "Rye-you" as opposed to "Ree-you". Despite issues with this, DeSouza decided to use "Rye-you" believing it would be easier to pronounce for Western audiences, although Jean-Claude Van Damme and Raul Julia both addressed him as "Ree-you" in the film.

Ryu's inclusion in Street Fighter EX was deemed natural by the studio, Arika, with producer Ichiro Mihara describing him as one of the three essential Street Fighter characters along with Chun-Li and Ken. Ansah talked about Ryu and Ken's story in Street Fighter: Assassin's Fist and said "a good analogy with Ryu is that he's not actually ever competing with anyone else; he's competing with himself. Whereas Ken is driven fiercely by competition."

For the game, Tekken X Street Fighter, producer Katsuhiro Harada commented that while Ryu might be able to perform his classic moves like the Hadouken reassuring his fans, most of his normal moves would be changed to play more like a Tekken character and fit the cast.

Game designer Masahiro Sakurai said that for Super Smash Bros., Ryu was recreated to play his Street Fighter II persona while having new moves because the controller had more buttons. Nevertheless, he was given a technique from Street Fighter III and new techniques exclusive to Smash. The Shoryuken was implemented in the character but as his strongest technique.

Appearances

In Street Fighter games

Ryu debuted in the first Street Fighter as the primary playable character, with his best friend, rival, and sparring partner Ken Masters serving as the second player's character. Both compete to test their strength against the tournament's champion, Sagat. His next appearance was in 1991's Street Fighter II. Set several years after Ryu defeated Sagat in the first tournament, Ryu participates in a second tournament. In his ending in the game, Ryu wins the tournament but does not stay for the ceremony, already seeking his next challenge. The Ultra Street Fighter II: The Final Challengers version of the game added Evil Ryu as a hidden character although the narrative does not explore this take on Ryu.

Ryus backstory, along with those of other Street Fighter characters, would be explored in the subsequent Street Fighter Alpha prequel series. The first game, Street Fighter Alpha: Warriors' Dreams (1995), features Ryu confronting Sagat as his last opponent in a rematch following their first game. Street Fighter Alpha 2 (1996) depicts Ryu on a quest to confront Akuma, his masters brother and enemy. After their match, Akuma reveals that Ryu possesses the  within him, the same power Akuma uses.

In the Street Fighter Alpha series, there is an alternative selectable version of Ryu known as "Evil Ryu". Like Akuma, Ryu takes this form when succumbing to the evil intent and becomes more violent. It was not until the international versions of the game, Street Fighter Alpha 2, that Evil Ryu was introduced as a playable secret character. Evil Ryu was originally introduced in a 1996 Street Fighter Zero manga series by Masahiko Nakahira and later adapted in the Street Fighter canon by Capcom. In Street Fighter Alpha 3 (1998), a man named M. Bison seeks Ryu to use him as his next host body. The two clash and Ryu emerges victorious, causing Bison to retreat. If Evil Ryu is used, he clashes with Akuma to decide who is the strongest user of Dark Hadou.

Ryu and Ken return in Street Fighter III (1997) and its updates. While Ryus motivation and rivalry with Ken would remain the same, he was also shown getting acquainted with several of the new characters featured in the game. Ryu appears in Street Fighter IV, which takes place after Street Fighter II but before Street Fighter III. Still conflicted by the Dark Hadou, Ryu fights a criminal organization while meeting his old rivals. A new appearance of Evil Ryu in a Street Fighter game was confirmed in Super Street Fighter IV: Arcade Edition by a teaser trailer, and he was later confirmed as a secret boss and playable character in leaked video footage. However, the evil energy manifested as its own entity, taking the form of an Oni version of Evil Ryu, referring to itself as Kage. Kage attempts to overpower Ryu but fails to shake his convictions and fades from existence.

Ryu has appeared in spin-offs related to the main Street Fighter series such as the Street Fighter EX series produced by Arika. Byron Mann portrays the character in the separately produced arcade and console games based on the American film of the series, both titled Street Fighter: The Movie, where he wears Ryu's characteristic white karate gi and red headband. The 1994 animated movie also inspired a movie where Ryu is featured.

In other games

Ryu has also been featured in Capcom's inter-company crossovers such as the Marvel vs. Capcom series, the SNK vs. Capcom series, Namco × Capcom, Tatsunoko vs. Capcom: Ultimate All-Stars, Project X Zone and Project X Zone 2. Some games in the SNK vs. Capcom series also include Evil Ryu as an unlockable character. Ryu is also an unlockable character in the new free fire update In Marvel vs. Capcom: Clash of Super Heroes, Ryu can change his moveset to the ones by Ken or Akuma while fighting. He appears in Super Puzzle Fighter II Turbo, a puzzle video game featuring super deformed characters, the sequel fighting game Super Gem Fighter Mini Mix, and the mobile puzzle game Street Fighter: Puzzle Spirits. Ryu is a playable fighter in the crossover fighting game Street Fighter X Tekken, and is also seen in the Tekken X Street Fighter poster along with Jin Kazama.

Onimusha: Dawn of Dreams features Ryu as an unlockable costume swap for the game's protagonist Soki. Although his incarnation there is much slimmer, this change is merely cosmetic and does not affect gameplay. Ryu has a cameo in the shooting game Varth: Operation Thunderstorm. He was also to appear in the now-cancelled game Mega Man Universe. A Ryu-inspired costume for players to use in Sony's LittleBigPlanet was released in 2008 as downloadable content for the title. A special downloadable episode in Asura's Wrath allows players to fight both Ryu and Evil Ryu. Ryu also appears as a playable character via downloadable content in the Nintendo crossover fighting games Super Smash Bros. for Nintendo 3DS and Wii U along with a stage based on his arena from Street Fighter II known as Suzaku Castle. Ryu returns in the sequel Super Smash Bros. Ultimate—this time available in the initial release—along with every other returning fighter in the series' history. He appears as a party member for a limited time event in the smartphone RPG, Granblue Fantasy, in a collaboration event titled "Ultra Granblue Fighter". Ryu is also a guest character in Power Rangers: Legacy Wars, appearing both in his traditional form and in an original Power Rangers form called the "Ryu Ranger". This same version of Ryu, now dubbed the "Crimson Hawk Ranger", appears as a playable character in Power Rangers: Battle for the Grid via downloadable content.

A playable Ryu outfit has also been added to Fortnite.

In other media

Live-action

Ryu is played by Byron Mann in the 1994 film version of Street Fighter, where he serves as a supporting protagonist, as Guile is the main character. In this depiction, Ryu is given the surname "Hoshi" and is presented as an American of Japanese ethnicity. While still master martial artists, he and Ken are a pair of traveling con artists who steal money from rich crime lords through schemes such as selling modified toy guns. He and Ken eventually work with Guile to infiltrate M. Bison's headquarters with a homing device to lure Guile and his forces there. In the film's climax, Ryu fights and defeats Vega in battle. Unlike the video games, Ryu does not fight Bison nor scar Sagat in the film, though Ryu does at one point attempt to fight Bison alongside Ken, Chun-Li, E. Honda and Balrog. Ryu ultimately plays a vital role in Bison's downfall by luring Guile to Bison's base with a tracking device. Although Guile gives them their freedom after Bison is defeated, they stay to help with the cleanup in Shadaloo, preferring to leave once this is finished.

Despite not appearing at all in Street Fighter: The Legend of Chun Li, Ryu is mentioned at the end of the movie as a formidable Japanese fighter entering a tournament.

Jon Foo played Ryu (given the surname "Takashi") in the fan film Street Fighter: Legacy.

Ryu appears as a main lead alongside Ken in Street Fighter: Assassin's Fist portrayed by martial arts actor/stuntman Mike Moh. The film is set before the events of the games, and focuses on Ryu and Ken's training under Gouken, while flashbacks show Gouken's past with his brother Gouki/Akuma and their mentor, Goutetsu. Moh reprised his role as Ryu in the five-part mini series Street Fighter: Resurrection.

Ryu appears in the 2018 film Ready Player One, based on the book of the same name by Ernest Cline.

In the 2018 film Goosebumps 2: Haunted Halloween, Slappy the Dummy uses magic to bring actions figures of Ryu and Ken to life.

Peter Jang portrays Ryu in the official crossover between the Power Rangers and Street Fighter titled Power Rangers: Legacy Wars—Street Fighter Showdown. In the short, Ryu morphs into the RyuRanger and Chun-Li teams with Tommy Oliver, Ninjor and Gia Moran to battle M. Bison and evil Power Rangers.

Animation

In the 1994 film Street Fighter II: The Animated Movie, Ryu is the central character and focus of several other characters, namely Sagat, Guile and Bison. After Ryu defeats and scars Sagat in the film's opening, Bison commands a worldwide manhunt for him, determined to make him a brainwashed member of Shadaloo (here known as Shadowlaw). He cannot find Ryu because of his travelling the world and his ability to suppress his power, rendering Bison's monitor cyborgs unable to detect him. Throughout the film, Ryu comes into contact with several fighters, such as Fei-Long and E. Honda. Bison eventually captures and brainwashes Ken in Ryu's stead. This prompts Guile and Interpol to intercept Ryu before Bison can get to him, but Bison follows them and sets Ken on Ryu, who refuses to fight his controlled friend. Ken manages to break free of Bison's control and the pair ultimately work together to defeat Bison. He was voiced by Kōjirō Shimizu in the Japanese version and Skip Stellrecht in the English dub.

Ryu also appears in the American TV series and is once again replaced by Guile as the protagonist since it is a continuation of the 1994 live-action film. Near the end of the series, however, the story shifts focus to Ryu and Ken, making them more prominent as they face several enemies such as the Mad Gear gang. In both the film and the series, Ryu's name is incorrectly pronounced "Raiyu", though in the movie Guile and Bison are the only ones who pronounce his name correctly.

The premise of the 1995 Japanese TV series Street Fighter II V centers on a young Ryu and Ken, who travel the world with Chun-Li to improve their martial art skills by challenging other fighters. He was voiced by Kōji Tsujitani in the Japanese version and again by Skip Stellrecht in the English Animaze dub. In the ADV Films dub he was portrayed by Brett Weaver and later by Tommy Drake.

The 1999 original video animation Street Fighter Alpha: The Animation centers on Ryu's inner conflict with the Dark Hadou, as seen in the Street Fighter Alpha manga and games. Original elements such as the appearance of Ryu's supposed younger brother, Shun, and their conflict with Professor Sadler and Rosanov were added. Like Bison, Professor Sadler seeks the world's greatest martial artists, to absorb their abilities into his own body, particularly Ryu's Dark Hadou. After Shun is abducted by Sadler's monitor cyborg, Rosanov, Ryu is implored by Rose to search for him. Ryu tracks down and confronts Akuma, demanding to know if Shun is his son, but Akuma, after attempting but failing to goad Ryu into giving in to the Dark Hadou, denies it. Enlisting the help of numerous fighters, Ryu tracks Sadler to his base, where he learns that Shun was working for Sadler and posed as his brother to lure him out. Enraged, Ryu gives into the Dark Hadou and obliterates Rosanov. At the same time he mortally wounds Shun, powering Sadler up enough for him to enter the battlefield personally. Worn out, Ryu is initially pummeled by Sadler, until a vision of Rose inspires him to use his normal power to fight. With help from his allies, he defeats Sadler for good. Shun dies in Ryu's arms, apologizing for his actions; Ryu forgives him. The 2005 OVA Street Fighter Alpha: Generations features a similar storyline, but is unrelated to the previous Alpha anime.

In 2008, Capcom released a new OVA where Crimson Viper is sent to capture Ryu on orders from Seth, who knows about Ryu's Satsui no Hado and wants it for himself. Ryu fights Seth and remains victorious.

Ryu made cameo appearances in the 3D Disney computer-animated film Wreck-It Ralph, with Kyle Hebert reprising his role. He first appears in a sparring match with Ken and decides to go to Tapper for a drink after the fight.

Ryu appears in a non-speaking cameo in the adult animated martial arts film Mortal Kombat Legends: Scorpion's Revenge.

Comics

Ryu also appears in many printed adaptations of the series. In the manga Street Fighter II by Masaomi Kanzaki, Ryu believes M. Bison murdered both Gouken and Ken and goes on a quest to avenge them. The manga Street Fighter: Sakura Ganbaru! by Masahiko Nakahira has Ryu as a central character from the storyline where the title character, Sakura Kasugano, wishes to meet him. Nakahira also wrote and illustrated "Street Fighter III: Ryu Final", which chronicles Ryu's ongoing quest for enlightenment during the Street Fighter III storyline that culminates into a decisive battle against Akuma.

Udon Entertainment's comic book adaptation of the Street Fighter plot places Ryu in the center of the plot's events. Ryu grows up training in the art of Ansatsuken all the while fighting off the urge of the Satsui no Hadō. He trains to be a strong fighter without relying on the hatred and consumption it brings. After returning from the first Street Fighter tournament, Ryu discovers his master Gouken has been slain by his brother Akuma and sets out with Ken to avenge his death. Ryu's victory over Sagat in the first Street Fighter tournament attracts the attention of Bison as well as Chun-Li and Guile, who believe there is a criminal connection between the two at first. He also trains Sakura during the comic's second arc and later trains with other fighters (specifically Dhalsim and Gen) to give himself a better chance against Akuma. Ryu attends Bison's tournament and advances all the way to the final stage. However, before he is able to fight Bison, Akuma intervenes and soundly defeats Bison instead with ease. The plot then shifts to the battle between Akuma and Ryu as the concluding fight of the comic series. During the battle, Ryu is almost corrupted by the Satsui no Hadō to defeat Akuma at any cost but refuses the power, which allows Akuma the upper hand in battle. All seems lost, but at the very last moment, Gouken returns and he finishes the battle with Akuma. Ryu passes out before the fight can conclude and is rescued from the sinking island by Dhalsim. Following the battle, Ryu believes he no longer needs to rely on Satsui no Hadō if he wants victory.

In the follow-up series, Ryu takes on Sakura as his official pupil after she graduates. After he is kidnapped by Urien and the Society, Sakura blames herself and Akuma manipulates her into succumbing to the Satsui no Hadō in an attempt to save him. Once he is freed, Ryu absorbs the Dark Hado from Sakura and transforms into Evil Ryu, leading him to battle Akuma in his Oni form. Gill arrives and uses his powers to defeat them and revert them to their base forms. In the Street Fighter Unlimited series, Ryu struggles to maintain the Dark Hado in him. He discovers his master Gouken is alive, who teaches him the final techniques of Ansatsuken to control his inner demons. When Ryu tells Gouken he wants to find a way to use the Satsui no Hadō against Akuma without fully succumbing to it, Gouken tells him to go to Brazil and seek out Oro. Oro agrees to teach Ryu how to balance his light and dark ki to achieve total balance. During their training, Ryu is invited to participate in Gill's fighting tournament. Oro tells him that if he defeats Gill, he will find a way to defeat Akuma. At the tournament, Gill gets Ryu to succumb to the Satsui no Hadō and transform into Evil Ryu before capturing him to use him to power Seth's Blece device to take over the Earth. As his allies struggle to defeat Gill, Ryu achieves total balance between his two natures and becomes Shin Ryu, who proves powerful enough to defeat Gill. He then has his rematch with Akuma and finally claims a victory against him. After defeating Akuma, Ryu returns to Brazil to resume his training with Oro to master his new powers.

Promotion and reception

Popularity
Ryu is consistently ranked as one of the most popular and memorable characters from the Street Fighter franchise and gaming overall among critics, taking the ninth place in a Capcom poll. GameSpot featured him in their article "All Time Greatest Game Hero", while CBR regarded him as a "video game icon" alongside Chun-Li thanks to their character development since their first appearances. He ranked number seventy-one in UGO Networks's "Top 100 Heroes of All Time" article. UGO also placed him at number two on their list of "Top 50 Street Fighter Characters" saying, "Whereas Ken is flashy, Ryu is contemplative, tortured and driven." IGN ranked him first in their "Top 25 Street Fighter Characters" article saying, "Ryu is a testament to the virtue of simplicity in character design. White gi, dark gloves, red headband for a little touch of color, and that is it. It's rare, when you think about it, to see too many fancy pieces go into the making of an icon." GameDaily listed him at number two in their "Top 20 Street Fighter Characters of All Time" article saying, "He always seeks a bigger challenge, and that determination makes him one of our favorites." In a later character profile article on Ryu, they noted, "Ryu is a formidable fighter that gets the job done ... Bottom line, you can't go wrong with Street Fighter's most iconic character." The same site ranked him sixth along with Ken in the Top 25 Capcom Characters of All Time with editor Robert Workman saying "It was just impossible to choose between one of these world warriors." He has also been recognized as one of the best all-time gaming characters. He was voted one of the best fifty characters both in a Famitsu issue and in the Guinness World Records Gamer's Edition in 2011. In the February 1992 issue of Gamest magazine in Japan, Ryu ranked third Best Character of 1991. In the 30 January 1997 issue Ryu ranked number thirteen in the Top 50 Characters of 1996. In a 2010 survey of 4,000 online matches for Super Street Fighter IV, Ryu was the most popular character, with 16.6% of the usage. In 2011, Empire ranked him as the 27th greatest video game character, adding "he has remained the definitive beat-'em-up fighter and go-to-guy for the discerning player since the days of SF2." Jeremy Parish of Polygon ranked 73 fighters from Super Smash Bros. Ultimate "from garbage to glorious", listing Ryu as 20th and stated that "Yes, he’s the main guy from Street Fighter, but at this point something like 20 different Street Fighters fight in a variant of Ryu's shotokan karate style, and nearly all of them have more interesting moves and stories than Ryu." Gavin Jasper of Den of Geek ranked Ryu as 39th of Super Smash Bros. Ultimate characters, criticizing the character's addition to the roster and stated that "he feels a bit too stiff in Smash. Capcom fit him nicely in a Marvel battlefield, but in Smash, but Nintendo doesn’t quite accomplish the same." Ian Walker of Kotaku described Ryu as a Kevin Bacon of video games.

Critical response
GamesRadar writer Tyler Wilde published an article focusing on Ken's and Ryu's development across the franchise under the title "The evolution of Ken and Ryu". The Guardian recommended Ryu and Ken for beginners in Street Fighter IV. Ryu was deemed better at fights from distances because of his projectiles moves. In GameSpots "Great Loves" article Ryu was described as "one of the most independent men in the world of video games" as he is interested only in training to become a stronger fighter in contrast to other Street Fighter characters who have romantic interests. UGO listed Ryu's headband twenty-sixth on their list of "The Coolest Helmets and Headgear in Video Games". In GamesRadar's article "The 56 characters of Marvel vs Capcom 2", Ryu was described as "the heart and soul of the Street Fighter series" and "probably the most well known fighting game character in the world". Den of Geek argued the character is appealing because of his wish to engage strong enemies and his growth since the Alpha series, most notably in Masahiko Nakahira's manga centered on Ryu which shows the character's appeal. GamesRadar called him "the epitome of fighting game characters" because in his wanderings he seeks to face only strong enemies. HobbyConsolas also included Ryu on their "The 30 best heroes of the last 30 years."

Evil Ryu was noted to be a trope of protagonist gaming characters who reveal an evil alter-ego. UGO Networks editor Paul Furfari said it made the Street Fighter Alpha series more entertaining because of the potential of his moves. The form shown in Super Street Fighter IV: Arcade Edition was noted to share traits from both Ryu and Akuma. GameSpot said that since he uses modified versions from known techniques, he was one of the least interesting additions to the game. The stronger damage he can inflict has been commented on by Game Informer, which mentioned he was even stronger than Seth, the Street Fighter IV boss. In a GamesRadar article by Michael Grimm, a fight between Evil Ryu and Devil Jin was described as one players wanted to see in Street Fighter X Tekken as the two are evil alter egos from two existing characters sharing similar designs and movesets with their original forms. Kage was criticized for being a recycled character based on Evil Ryu because of their similar looks and moves.

Ryu's characterization in the Street Fighter II animated feature was a subject of praise. Eurogamer enjoyed his multiple journeys across the film such as his meeting with E. Honda and the exploration of his backstory. Kotaku liked his fight scenes because of how well they are choreographed, his presentation and his relationship with Ken. THEM Anime Reviews shared similar comments about how Ryu's past with Ken is explored and how he fights against multiple enemies even if the plot is an excuse for the fights. The young Ryu from the anime TV series Street Fighter II V was felt to be enjoyable because of the way he interacts with Sagat and how skilled the character becomes across the story despite his first beatdown by Guile. Though disappointed by Chun-Li's take in this series, THEM Anime Reviews enjoyed the handling of the trio of Ryu, Ken and Chun-Li during the TV series believing they provide an interesting damsel-in-distress quest. In another review, THEM Anime Reviews found that the trio had enough character development and stronger techniques while noting some issues within the plot. Den of Geek noted one of best takes of Ryu's characterization was in the manga Final where he stands out thanks to the narrative.

Cultural impact

One of Ryu's quotes from Street Fighter II is, "You must defeat Sheng Long to stand a chance." The quote caused a controversy among gamers, who wondered whether there was actually a character named Sheng Long. Although the quote was actually a mistranslation, it was exploited as an April Fools' joke various times by gaming magazines. Nevertheless, the character was referred to in the video games based on live-action films as Ryu's teacher. Moreover, the fans' request to include Sheng Long, led to Gouken's inclusion in Street Fighter IV. Ryu's original designer, Takashi Nishiyama, revealed that Art of Fightings Ryo Sakazaki was created as an homage to the original Ryu. After the release of the game some members of the original Street Fighter video game development team at Capcom moved to SNK. This is further explored in the crossover games SNK developed with the Capcom franchises where Ryu often interacts with Ryo. While in charge of developing the character Kyo Kusanagi, Yuichiro Hiraki was contemplating making Kyo completely different from Ryu. He believed Ryu was a popular character and that Kyo's characterization and design need to be in distinct contrast to be appealing to reach Ryu's level of popularity level. He explored this idea further when developing Street Fighter V years later. Ryu also inspired the character of Akuma. The designers wanted Akuma to be based on his design rather than the other villain of Street Fighter II, M. Bison.

In 1993, Hong Kong artist Situ Jianqian used the names of Ryu, Ken and Chun-li in his comic Supergod Z: Cyber Weapon. However, Jianqian received a warning from Capcom about the use of these names and removed them from the comic but kept the character designs of the cast which resembled these Street Fighter characters. While noting that Ryu was one of the most popular Japanese characters in gaming, Benjamin Wai-ming Ng from the University of Hong Kong said that in China, the cast was overshadowed by main characters from SNK's fighting series, The King of Fighters. In 2019, a scientific work concluded that Ryu would have to move at almost  through the air to perform a Tatsumaki Senpukyaku. Briana Lawrence of The Mary Sue said that she's leaning on Ryu’s screencap on Street Fighter 6 trailer being more unintentional moment than Lady Dimitrescu.

References

Bibliography

External links

Ryu Hoshi at the Internet Movie Database

Action film characters
Ansatsuken
Capcom protagonists
Fictional characters with alter egos
Fictional homeless people
Fictional Japanese people in video games
Fictional judoka
Fictional kenpō practitioners
Fictional kyokushin kaikan practitioners
Fictional male martial artists
Fictional martial artists in video games
Fictional shotokan practitioners
Male characters in video games
Orphan characters in video games
Street Fighter characters
Super Smash Bros. fighters
Video game characters based on real people
Video game characters introduced in 1987
Video game characters with fire or heat abilities
Video game characters with electric or magnetic abilities
Video game mascots